Abbotsbury Blind Lane is a  geological Site of Special Scientific Interest in Dorset, notified in 1986; this area is slightly smaller than when it was first notified in 1977. It is also a Geological Conservation Review (GCR) site.

References

Sources
 English Nature citation sheet for the site (accessed 29 August 2006)

External links
 English Nature website (SSSI information)

Sites of Special Scientific Interest in Dorset
Sites of Special Scientific Interest notified in 1977